Airborne Electronic Attack (AEA) is a European Union Permanent Structured Cooperation (PESCO) initiative meant to equip future European military aircraft with new electronic-warfare capabilities. The project is led by Spain with the goal of enabling a platform for Airborne Electronic Attack missions that could adapt to the latest electronic warfare requirements, which include suppression of enemy air defences, escort/modified-escort role, non-traditional electronic attack, self-protected/time-critical strike support, and continuous capability enhancement. The system will also protect the GNSS from interference by foreign powers in various ways.

It will follow a modular development approach, with the option of being inside the aircraft or in a pod configuration, in order to be compatible with different aircraft, such as the Eurofighter Typhoon or the Future Combat Air System. It will allow European air forces to safely carry out operations within EU territory and the projection of the force in other potential areas of operations.

Features 
Main features:

 Very high ERP, for main, side and scattered lobes jamming
 Solid-state active phased array AESA jamming
 Multiple DRFM architecture for simultaneous beam aimed multi-threat jamming
 Smart digital jamming techniques
 Up to 360° wide angular coverage
 Extended low and high brand threat coverage capabilities

Increased ES/EA mission capability through advanced jamming functions:

 Pod or internally mounted, for fighter aircraft, UAV, J-UCAV or mission aircraft with network centric warfare (NCW) capabilities
 Very high power main / side / scattered lobe jamming
 Unsigned raid DDA, up to RF horizon action possible
 Smart techniques / coherent waveforms / covert jamming
 Smart power management using active phased array transmitter

Members

Companies 
 Indra

See also 

 Common Security and Defence Policy
 Permanent Structured Cooperation
 European Main Battle Tank
 European Patrol Corvette
 Eurocopter Tiger
 European External Action Service

References 

Permanent Structured Cooperation projects
Electronic warfare
Electronic countermeasures